The 1st Tank Division was a Division sized unit of the Red Army that existed from 1940–42.  It was later reformed, from a separate formation, with a different lineage. Within the Soviet Ground Forces it existed as a second line ready division from 1945–2008, at Kaliningrad in the Baltic Military District.

First formation 
The division was first formed in July 1940 and had the following structure:

 Headquarters under Colonel Vasiliy Ivanovich Ivanov
 1st Tank Regiment
 2nd Tank Regiment
 1st Motorized Rifle Regiment
 1st Motorized Howitzer Regiment
 1st Reconnaissance Battalion
 1st Motorized Anti-Aircraft Artillery Battalion
 1st Motorized Pontoon Battalion
 63rd Field Post Office
 204th State Bank Field Officer

When under the control of the Leningrad Military District the division was assigned to the 1st Mechanized Corps where it remained until its disbandment.  When the division was disbanded the division was broken up and used to create the new 122nd, 123rd, and 124th Tank Brigades.  Before disbandment the division contained the following units:

 Headquarters under Major General Yakov Grigorevich Kreizer
 1st Tank Regiment
 2nd Tank Regiment
 1st Howitzer Artillery Regiment
 1st Separate Anti-Aircraft Artillery Battalion
 1st Reconnaissance Battalion
 1st Pontoon Battalion
 1st Signals Battalion
 1st Field Hospital Battalion
 1st Motor Transport Battalion
 1st Maintenance (Repair and Recovery) Battalion
 1st Chemical Defense Company
 1st Field Bakery
 63rd Field Post Station
 204th Field Ticket Officer of the State Bank

Second formation 
The Division was re-formed for its second time on 18 August 1941 from the 1st Motor Rifle Division.  The division had the following formation upon creation:

 Headquarters
 12th Tank Regiment
 6th Motorized Rifle Regiment
 175th Motorized Rifle Regiment
 13th Artillery Regiment
 300th Separate Anti-Aircraft Artillery Battalion
 Mortar Battalion
 93rd Reconnaissance Battalion
 28th Separate Signals Battalion
 87th Medical Battalion
 45th Motor Transport Battalion
 54th Repair and Recovery Company
 22nd Engineer Company
 30th Field Bakery
 218th Field Post Station
 63rd Field Ticket Officer of the State Bank

Insterburgskaya Tank Division 
The division was established 4 July 1945 in Kaliningrad, Kaliningrad Oblast, from the 1st Tank Corps.

After the end of the war the division was stationed in Kaliningrad and had the following structure:
 Headquarters
 89th Tank Regiment
 117th Tank Regiment
 159th Tank Regiment
 44th Motorized Rifle Regiment
 98th Guards Heavy Self-Propelled Artillery Regiment
 108th Mortar Regiment
 1720th Anti-Aircraft Artillery Regiment
 Independent Howitzer Artillery Battalion
 10th Independent Guards Mortar Battalion
 86th Independent Motorcycle Battalion
 183rd Independent Sapper Battalion
 767th Independent Signals Battalion
 190th Independent Medical Battalion
 Independent Auto-Transport Battalion
 72nd Independent Tank Training Battalion

Early 1950s 
After force reductions in early 1953, Soviet divisions were re-organized and most were drawn down to just cadre brigades, including the 1st Tank Division.  The reforms mostly were because of the draw-down after the end of the Second World War and the changes were mostly organized by Nikita Khrushchev and his cabinet.  The "division" had the following structure after the re-forms:

 Headquarters at Kaliningrad
 89th Tank Regiment
 117th Tank Regiment
 159th Tank Regiment
 127th Mechanized Rifle Regiment
886th Artillery Regiment
 98th Guards Heavy Self-Propelled Artillery Regiment
 1720th Anti-Aircraft Artillery Regiment (1955 re-named to 1043rd Anti-Aircraft Artillery Regiment)
 10th Independent Guards Mortar Battalion
 86th Independent Reconnaissance Battalion
 183rd Independent Sapper Battalion
 767th Independent Signals Battalion
 190th Independent Medical Battalion
 Independent Auto-Transport Battalion
Independent Chemical Defense Company
 72nd Independent Tank Training Battalion

Later in June 1957 the division was re-organized yet again including:

 159th Tank Regiment - disbanded
 98th Guards Heavy Self-Propelled Artillery Regiment – re-named 98th Guards Heavy Tank Regiment
 127th Mechanized Rifle Regiment – renamed to 290th Motorized Rifle Regiment

Just three years later in 1960, the 72nd Independent Tank Training Battalion was disbanded.

Structure in 1990 
After many years the Soviet Ground Forces had a major re-fit under Dmitry Yazov including the 1st Tank Division.  In 1990 the division consisted of the following just before its major re-organization:

 Headquarters - Kaliningrad
 89th Tank Regiment - Kornevo
 117th Tank Regiment - Kornevo
 501st Independent Guard and Service Battalion - Mamonovo
 79th Guards Motorized Rifle Regiment - Kaliningrad
 886th Self-Propelled Artillery Regiment - Kaliningrad
 1043rd Anti-Aircraft Missile Regiment - Kaliningrad
 79th Independent Reconnaissance Battalion - Kornevo
 218th Independent Missile Battalion - Kaliningrad
 183rd Independent Engineer-Sapper Battalion - Kaliningrad
 767th Independent Communications Battalion - Kaliningrad
 140th Independent Maintenance Battalion - Kaliningrad
 Independent Chemical Defense Company - Kaliningrad
 190th Independent Medical Battalion - Kaliningrad
 1037th Independent Supply Battalion - Kaliningrad

In 1993 the 1st Tank Division was reduced in status to the 2nd Independent Tank Brigade.  Finally, in 1998 the brigade was re-organized and became the 385th Weapons and Equipment Storage Base.  The base was finally disbanded in 2008 as a result of the 2008 Russian military reform.

References 

Tank divisions of the Soviet Union
Tank divisions of the Soviet Union in World War II
Tank divisions of Russia
Military units and formations disestablished in 1993